Homeland is a city in Charlton County, Georgia, United States. The population was 910 at the 2010 census.

History
Homeland was founded in 1906.

Geography

Homeland is located in southeastern Georgia at  (30.859445, -82.022074). It is bordered to the south by Folkston, the Charlton County seat.

Demographics

As of the 2010 United States Census, there were 910 people living in the city. The racial makeup of the city was 90.0% White, 7.1% Black, 0.5% Native American, 0.1% from some other race and 1.0% from two or more races. 1.2% were Hispanic or Latino of any race.

As of the census of 2000, there were 765 people, 282 households, and 201 families living in the city. The racial makeup of the city was 91.11% White, 4.31% African American, 1.83% Native American, 0.13% Asian, 0.26% from other races, and 2.35% from two or more races. Hispanic or Latino of any race were 1.18% of the population.

There were 282 households, out of which 35.1% had children under the age of 18 living with them, 50.0% were married couples living together, 16.0% had a female householder with no husband present, and 28.7% were non-families. 26.6% of all households were made up of individuals, and 9.9% had someone living alone who was 65 years of age or older.  The average household size was 2.71 and the average family size was 3.26.

In the city, the population was spread out, with 31.4% under the age of 18, 8.9% from 18 to 24, 26.9% from 25 to 44, 21.8% from 45 to 64, and 11.0% who were 65 years of age or older.  The median age was 33 years. For every 100 females, there were 83.0 males.  For every 100 females age 18 and over, there were 86.2 males.

The median income for a household in the city was $24,722, and the median income for a family was $30,417. Males had a median income of $24,432 versus $20,089 for females. The per capita income for the city was $11,980.  About 19.2% of families and 23.4% of the population were below the poverty line, including 34.1% of those under age 18 and 8.6% of those age 65 or over.

References

Cities in Georgia (U.S. state)
Cities in Charlton County, Georgia